Attaneuria is a genus of common stoneflies in the family Perlidae. It is monotypic, being represented by the single species, Attaneuria ruralis.

References

Further reading

 
 

Perlidae
Articles created by Qbugbot